Mäo is a village in Paide Parish, Järva County in northern-central Estonia.

Estonian footballer and Olympic competitor Johannes Brenner (1906–1975) was born Mäo. Estonian supermodel Carmen Kass (born 1978), grew up in Mäo village.

References

Villages in Järva County
Kreis Jerwen